Cocktail 2000 is a science fiction drama action series of books written by Egyptian author Nabil Farouk and published by Modern Arab Association as a part of Rewayat.

The books are a mixture of short stories, reflections and surveys, with the biggest part being a science-fiction novel. Topics include time travel, other worlds, other planets, scientific experiments, dramas, predicting the future, and strange accidents.
In the novels numbered 25, 26, and 50, the writer discusses Adham Sabry, the hero of Ragol Al Mostaheel, the man of impossible.

The novels 
 The Prophecy
 The Sword of Justice (against unknown)  
 The Alternative
 A Bedouin Woman
 The Damn of the Sea
 The Delegate
 The Secret of the Palace
 Investigation
 The Mysterious Visitor
 The Knight 
 The Price of Friendship
 The Phoenix
 The Island of the Fate
 The Call of the Deep
 The Terrible Experiment
 The Task
 The Thing
 The Fifth Dimension
 The Guest of the Stars
 The Baath 
 The Maker of the Games
 The Tenth Planet
 The Time Machine
 The Puzzle
 Papers of Hero
 The Epic
 The Heir
 The Castle of the Secrets
 The Process of the Master (across time)
 Qarun
 The Blood
 The Call
 The Germ
 A Vision
 The Strange Man
 The Brutal Series
 The Trip
 The Center of the Sea
 The Prince
 The Variables, Part 1
 The Knight of the Future, Part 2
 The Mysterious
 This Day
 The Crimson Flower
 A Digital Crime
 The Coming
 The Memory of Tomorrow
 The Star
 My Dear Grandfather
 The Target is You
 The Anger

Egyptian fiction
Science fiction book series